WGSS may refer to:

 WGSS (FM), a radio station (89.3 FM) licensed to Copiague, New York, United States
 WRZE, a radio station (94.1 FM) licensed to Kingstree, South Carolina, United States, which held the call sign WGSS from 1996 to 2009
 Walnut Grove Secondary School, a secondary school in Langley, British Columbia, Canada